Muḥammad Isḥāq Madnī (1933–2013) was one of the popular Pakistani Islamic scholars.

Biography
He was born in 1933 in a small landholding family in Lyallpur. After matriculation he passed his Fellow of Arts (FA) in first division from Government College Lyallpur with Mathematics as an additional subject. Later on he developed a tendency towards religion and in order to understand religious works he learned Arabic, Persian, Urdu and English. He used to help his father in working his lands and continued reading books in one hand while ploughing the fields. Molvi Ahmed Mallah taught him Sarf (morphology) and Nahw (syntax) then he sought guidance about logic, philosophy, and other fine arts from Maulana Imadad ul Haq. He became an expert in Arabic language and literature, and entered the field of research.

He continued delivering sermons in his village mosque till 1983. Later on, he started performing his responsibilities in the principal mosque of Faisalabad named Jamia Masjid Muhammadi Karimia. He became popular, many people reformed their beliefs on account of his Friday sermons. He answered people's question on Fatawa Online.

He had a unique fervent style with which he gave opinions on various religious matters. Ishaq was one of very few religious research scholars who apart from being a traditionalist was also exceptionally pragmatic. Proclaiming on various matters of Sharia he not only established his reasoning on the basis of valid traditions but also never failed to convince his audience with logical arguments. Ishaq had great command over sentiments as well as arguments and for this reason he was held in high esteem among both the Shia and Sunni schools of thought and his speeches were heard with rapt attention.He had unbelievable understanding of differences of opinions amongst various Islamic school of thoughts, he had a great memory and could provide the past opinions of the fuqaha, muhaddeseen and mufassereen of different ages to support his arguments instantly.  Ishaq died on 21 Shawal 1434 Hijri corresponding to 28 August 2013.

Views 
Ishaq believed in the unity of the Islamic community (Ummah). He never denounced any sect and for this reason his circle of friends counted people of all sects. Ishaq Madni proclaimed openly, "Religion does not preach enmity amongst us, my message is one of love, to whatever extent it may lead".He believed that Islamic scholars should focus only on saheeh hadiths instead of d'aif hadiths. He also believed that learned scholars of Islam should be unbiased towards the different Islamic schools of thoughts and should study the differences of opinions thoroughly and should give fatawa based on authenticity of the opinion not on the greatness or influence of the school of thought. He also propagated love and respect of ahlul bayt among all muslims.

Criticism
Ishaq claimed to argued with complete and detailed references in his discourse and speech and then used to hold his position adamantly which led to a number of scholars disagreeing with him. Their criticism against Ishaq was that he was neither a complete Ahl-e-Hadīs nor a complete Shia, Barelvi, Deobandi.

Literary works
 Wahdat-e-Ummat
 Maqsad-e-Hussain
 Khutbat-e-Ishaq

References

1935 births
2013 deaths
Pakistani Sunni Muslim scholars of Islam
Pan-Islamism
People from Faisalabad
Biographical evaluation scholars
Ahl-i Hadith people